Galicea Mare is a commune in Dolj County, Oltenia, Romania with a population of 4,950 people. It is composed of a single village, Galicea Mare.

References

Communes in Dolj County
Localities in Oltenia